The 1995 Baltimore Orioles season was a season in American baseball. It involved the Orioles finishing 3rd in the American League East with a record of 71 wins and 73 losses.

Offseason
 November 18, 1994: Mark Lee was signed as a free agent by the Orioles.
 December 6, 1994: Jay Powell was traded by the Orioles to the Florida Marlins for Bret Barberie.

Regular season

The Orioles scored 704 runs (4.89 per game) and allowed only 640 runs (4.44 per game), second only to the Cleveland Indians. The Orioles pitching staff also allowed the fewest hits in the Majors (1,165), the most complete games (19) and the most shutouts in the AL (10).

Cal Ripken breaks Lou Gehrig's record
On Wednesday, September 6, 1995, many baseball fans within and out of the United States tuned into cable TV network ESPN (and called by Chris Berman and Buck Martinez) to watch Ripken surpass Lou Gehrig's 56-year-old record for consecutive games played. The game, between the Orioles and the California Angels, still ranks as one of the network's most watched baseball games. Cal's children, Rachel and Ryan, threw out the ceremonial first balls.

Both President Bill Clinton and Vice-President Al Gore were at the game. President Clinton was in the WBAL local radio broadcast booth when Ripken hit a home run in the fourth inning, and called the home run over the air.  When the game became official after the Angels' half of the fifth inning, the numerical banners that displayed Ripken's streak on the wall of the B&O Warehouse outside the stadium's right field wall changed from 2130 to 2131.

Everyone attending (including the opposing Angels and all four umpires) erupted with a standing ovation lasting more than 22 minutes, one of the longest standing ovations for any athlete; ESPN did not go to a commercial break during the entire ovation.  During the ovation, Cal was convinced by his teammates to take an impromptu victory lap around the entire Camden Yards to shake hands and give high-fives to the fans, creating a highlight reel moment that's been played repeatedly over the years since then.

Season standings

Record vs. opponents

Notable transactions
 April 9, 1995: Jesse Orosco was signed as a free agent by the Orioles.
 April 21, 1995: Andy Van Slyke was signed as a free agent by the Orioles.
 May 16, 1995: Jack Voigt was traded by the Orioles to the Texas Rangers for John Dettmer.
 June 14, 1995: Jarvis Brown was sent to the Orioles by the Cincinnati Reds as part of a conditional deal.
 June 18, 1995: Andy Van Slyke was traded by the Orioles to the Philadelphia Phillies for Gene Harris.
 July 28, 1995: Damon Buford and Alex Ochoa were traded by the Orioles to the New York Mets for Bobby Bonilla and a player to be named later. The Mets completed the deal by sending Jimmy Williams (minors) to the Orioles on August 16.

Roster

Player stats

Batting

Starters by position
Note: Pos = Position; G = Games played; AB = At bats; H = Hits; Avg. = Batting average; HR = Home runs; RBI = Runs batted in

Other batters
Note: G = Games played; AB = At bats; H = Hits; Avg. = Batting average; HR = Home runs; RBI = Runs batted in

Pitching

Starting pitchers
Note: G = Games pitched; IP = Innings pitched; W = Wins; L = Losses; ERA = Earned run average; SO = Strikeouts

Other pitchers
Note: G = Games pitched; IP = Innings pitched; W = Wins; L = Losses; ERA = Earned run average; SO = Strikeouts

Relief pitchers
Note: G = Games pitched; W = Wins; L = Losses; SV = Saves; ERA = Earned run average; SO = Strikeouts

Awards and honors
 Cal Ripken Jr., Associated Press Athlete of the Year
 Cal Ripken Jr., Sports Illustrated Sportsman of the Year

Farm system

References

1995 Baltimore Orioles team page at Baseball Reference
1995 Baltimore Orioles season at baseball-almanac.com

Baltimore Orioles seasons
Baltimore Orioles season
Baltimore